The FIBA Asia Under-18 Championship 2002 is the 17th edition of the International Basketball Federation FIBA Asia's youth championship for basketball. The games were held at Kuwait City from December 16–26, 2002.

Draw

* Mongolia, Thailand and Bahrain withdrew from the tournament; Yemen was later added to Group D.

Preliminary round

Group A

Group B

Group C

Group D

Quarterfinal round

Group I

Group II

Group III

Group IV

Classification 5th–14th

13th place

11th place

9th place

7th place

5th place

Final round

Semifinals

3rd place

Final

Final standing

Awards

References
 Japan Basketball Association

FIBA Asia Under-18 Championship
2002–03 in Asian basketball
2002 in Kuwaiti sport
International basketball competitions hosted by Kuwait
December 2002 sports events in Asia